Gonzalo Escudero Moscoso (Quito, September 28, 1903 – Brussels, December 10, 1971) was an Ecuadorian poet and diplomat.

He spent his high school years at the Instituto Nacional Mejía. Later, he attended the Central University of Ecuador, where he obtained his doctorate degree in jurisprudence. He was a distinguished professor of international law at the University of Quito, Secretary of Education, Secretary of Congress, and Minister of Foreign Affairs.

He served as Ecuador's ambassador to Uruguay (1942-1845), Peru (1956), Argentina (1961), Colombia (1963), Brazil (1965), UNESCO (1960) and Belgium (1971).

Works
 Los Poemas del Arte (1918)
 Las Parábolas Olímpicas (1922)
 Altanoche (1947)
 Hélices de Huracán y de Sol (1933)
 Estatura del Aire (1951)
 Paralelogramo (obra de teatro)
 Material del Ángel
 Autorretrato
 Introducción a la Muerte
 Hombre de América
 Dios
 Ases
 Pleamar de Piedra
 Réquiem por la Luz
 Nocturno de Septiembre
 Contrapunto

References 

1903 births
1971 deaths
Ecuadorian male poets
People from Quito
Central University of Ecuador alumni
Ambassadors of Ecuador to Peru
Ambassadors of Ecuador to Argentina
Ambassadors of Ecuador to Colombia
Ambassadors of Ecuador to Brazil
Ambassadors of Ecuador to Uruguay
Ambassadors of Ecuador to Belgium
Permanent Representatives of Ecuador to the Organization of American States
Permanent Delegates of Ecuador to UNESCO
20th-century Ecuadorian poets
20th-century male writers